Chen Yin may refer to:

Chen Yin (6th century) (born 573), crown prince of the Chinese Chen Dynasty
Chen Yin (swimmer) (born 1986), Chinese swimmer
Chen Yin (TV presenter), Chinese television program host